When Life Gives You Lemons, You Paint That Shit Gold is the fifth studio album by the Minneapolis hip hop group Atmosphere. It was released on Atmosphere's own Rhymesayers Entertainment label on April 22, 2008. It was praised for Ant's synthesizer-based production and Slug's storytelling rap. The album features a cameo performance by singer-songwriter Tom Waits, who performs guitar and beatboxing on the song "The Waitress".

Release
The album was released in two different packages: a standard digipak and a limited edition (25,000 copies) 36-page hard-cover book featuring an illustrated children's story written by Slug and a bonus DVD entitled Sad Clown Bad Dub 13 containing over an hour of live footage and extras.

Reception
At Metacritic, which assigns a weighted average score out of 100 to reviews from mainstream critics, the album received an average score of 68 out of 100 based on 15 reviews, indicating "generally favorable reviews".

When Life Gives You Lemons, You Paint That Shit Gold debuted at number 5 on the US Billboard 200, selling about 36,000 copies in its first week. It is Atmosphere's first album to reach the top ten of the Billboard 200 and the highest charting release from the independent label Rhymesayers Entertainment.

Track listing

Personnel
Atmosphere
Anthony Davis – keyboards, turntables, production
Sean Daley – vocals
Additional personnel
Brett Johnson – bass guitar
Erick Anderson – piano, synthesizers
Brian McLeod – drums
Nate Collis – guitar
Joe Mabbott – percussion, engineering
Mankwe Ndosi – vocals
Rajiah Johnson – flute
Tom Waits – beatboxing, guitar, shaker (on "The Waitress")

References

Further reading
"Purple Rain Dogs: Tom Waits for Prince Fans--Or How Atmosphere Went Electro" - City Pages (4/30/08).

External links

2008 albums
Atmosphere (music group) albums
Rhymesayers Entertainment albums